Pandit Todarmal (1719–1766) was an eminent Indian Jain scholar and writer. He led the creation of terapanthi community among the Digambara Jains by rejecting the authority of bhattarakas. He wrote moksha-marga-prakashaka.

According to Pandit Bakhtawar Shah, Todarmal was arrested on a false charge of removing an idol and was executed by the order of a Jaipur ruler who was under the influence of some staunch anti-Jain individuals in the court, who had become jealous of his influence.

His son, Gumaniram, formed a sub-sect named Gumanapantha in 1770s and named it shuddha terapantha amana (pure terapantha tradition) by making the rules stricter.

See also  
 Fatehgarh Sahib

References

Citations

Sources
 
 

1719 births
1766 deaths
Scholars of Jainism
Indian Jain monks
18th-century Indian Jains
18th-century Jain monks
18th-century Indian monks
People from Fatehgarh Sahib district